Widukind of Corvey (c. 925after 973) was a medieval Saxon chronicler. His three-volume Res gestae Saxonicae sive annalium libri tres is an important chronicle of 10th-century Germany (Germania) during the rule of the Ottonian dynasty.

Life

In view of his name, he possibly was a descendant of the Saxon leader and national hero Widukind, mentioned in the Royal Frankish Annals, who had battled Charlemagne in the Saxon Wars from 777 to 785. Widukind the Chronicler entered the Benedictine abbey of Corvey in the Westphalian part of Saxony around 940/42, probably to become a tutor. It is widely assumed that he had reached the age of 15 upon his access, though it has been recently suggested that he may have joined the Order as a child. In 936 Henry the Fowler, the first East Frankish king of the Saxon ducal Ottonian dynasty had died and was succeeded by his son Otto the Great.

Otto's rise as undisputed ruler of a German kingdom against the reluctant dukes made great impression on the Benedictine monk. By his own admission, Widukind first wrote several Christian hagiographies before he began his Res gestae Saxonicae. He dedicated the chronicles to Abbess Matilda of Quedlinburg (c. 955999), daughter of Emperor Otto the Great, like himself a descendant of the Saxon leader Widukind. The annals were written after Otto's coronation by Pope John XII on 2 February 962; however, though both Otto and his father Henry the Fowler are named Imperatores, this incident is not mentioned. After the elevation of Matilda's brother Otto II as co-emperor in 967 and the death of her half-brother Archbishop William of Mainz one year later, the abbess remained the only important member of the Ottonian dynasty in the Saxon lands under regent Hermann Billung; therefore, Widukind may have begun the writing – or started all over again – to create a kind of mirror for princes.

The annals were continued until Otto's death on 7 May 973. Widukind probably died thereafter at Corvey Abbey.

Work

The Res gestae Saxonicae are significant historical accounts of the times of Otto the Great and Henry the Fowler, modelled on the works of the Roman historian Sallust and the deuterocanonical Books of the Maccabees. Widukind wrote as a Saxon, proud of his people and history, beginning his narration not with the Roman Empire but with a brief synopsis derived from the orally-transmitted history of the Saxons and their struggles with the Franks, with a terseness that makes his work difficult to interpret.

Widukind of Corvey starts with the wars between Theuderich I, King of Austrasia, and the Thuringii, in which the Saxons played a large part. An allusion to the conversion of the Saxons to Christianity under Charlemagne brings him to the early Saxon dukes and details of the reign of Henry the Fowler, whose campaigns are referred to in some detail. He omitted Italian events in tracing the career of Henry, nor does he ever mention a pope, but one of the three surviving manuscripts of his Gesta was transcribed in Benevento, the Lombard duchy south of Rome. The second book opens with the election of Otto the Great as German king, treats of the risings against his authority, again omitting events in Italy, and concludes with the death of his first wife Edith of England in 946. In the third book the historian deals with Otto's expedition into France, his troubles with his son Liudolf and his son-in-law, Conrad, Duke of Lorraine, and the various wars in Germany.

A manuscript of Res gestae Saxonicae sive annalium libri tres  was first published in Basel in 1532 and is today in the British Library. There are two other surviving manuscripts. The best edition was published in 1935 by Paul Hirsch and Hans-Eberhard Lohmann in the series Monumenta Germaniae Historica: Scriptores rerum Germanicarum in usum scholarum editi. A German translation appears in the Quellen zur Geschichte der sächsischen Kaiserzeit published by Albert Bauer and Reinhold Rau in 1971. An English translation is found in an unprinted doctoral dissertation: Raymond F. Wood, The three books of the deeds of the Saxons, by Widukind of Corvey, translated with introduction, notes, and bibliography (University of California, Los Angeles, 1949).

Widukind is also credited with vitae of St Paul and St Thecla doubtless based on the 2nd century Acts of Paul and Thecla, but no traces of them now remain.

References

External links

 An English translation with notes by Raymund F. Wood, The three books of the Deeds of the Saxons, unpublished doctoral dissertation, University of California, Berkeley, 1949, available from ProQuest Dissertations & Theses 

Old Saxony
920s births
Year of birth uncertain
Year of death unknown
10th-century German historians
German male writers
10th-century Saxon people
10th-century Latin writers